The 2019 Moselle Open was a tennis tournament played on indoor hard courts. It was the 17th edition of the Moselle Open, and part of the ATP Tour 250 Series of the 2019 ATP Tour. It took place at the Arènes de Metz from 16 September to  22 September 2019.

Singles main-draw entrants

Seeds

 1 Rankings are as of 9 September 2019

Other entrants
The following players received wildcards into the singles main draw:
  Grégoire Barrère
  Antoine Hoang
  Rayane Roumane

The following players received entry using a protected ranking into the singles main draw:
  Steve Darcis
  Cedrik-Marcel Stebe

The following players received entry from the qualifying draw:
  Marcel Granollers
  Julian Lenz
  Yannick Maden
  Oscar Otte

Withdrawals
  Jérémy Chardy → replaced by  Aljaž Bedene
  Marin Čilić → replaced by  Cedrik-Marcel Stebe
  Leonardo Mayer → replaced by  Marius Copil
  Albert Ramos Viñolas → replaced by  Steve Darcis

Retirements
  Nikoloz Basilashvili

Doubles main-draw entrants

Seeds

 Rankings are as of 9 September 2019

Other entrants
The following pairs received wildcards into the doubles main draw:
  Dan Added /  Albano Olivetti
  Tristan Lamasine /  Jo-Wilfried Tsonga

Finals

Singles

  Jo-Wilfried Tsonga defeated  Aljaž Bedene, 6–7(4–7), 7–6(7–4), 6–3

Doubles

  Robert Lindstedt /  Jan-Lennard Struff defeated  Nicolas Mahut /  Édouard Roger-Vasselin, 2–6, 7–6(7–1), [10–4]

References

External links
 Official website

2019 ATP Tour
 
September 2019 sports events in France